Moon Byul-yi (born December 22, 1992), better known by her stage name Moonbyul, is a South Korean rapper and singer signed under RBW. She is the rapper of the girl group Mamamoo and its sub-unit Mamamoo+. In May 2018, Moonbyul made her debut as a solo artist, releasing the digital single "Selfish".

Early Life
Moon Byul-yi was born in Bucheon, Gyeonggi-do, South Korea, and is the oldest of three sisters. She decided to become a singer after watching TVXQ’s "Rising Sun" performance in 2005 and attended SM Entertainment’s Starlight academy (closed down in 2013) which nurtured idols such as Girls Generation’s Taeyeon. She was accepted into Paekche Institute of the Arts for media music and vocals in 2011.

Career
Moonbyul debuted as a member of Mamamoo on June 19, 2014.

On May 23, 2018, Moonbyul debuted as a solo artist with the EP Selfish, containing the single of the same name, featuring Seulgi of Red Velvet. The album also contains hip-hop R&B track "In My Room" and the acoustic version of formerly released "Love & Hate".

Moonbyul released her second EP, Dark Side of the Moon, on February 14, 2020. The album explores a range of genres including jazz, blues, ballads and hip hop, while the single "Eclipse" is described as a "powerful blend of rock, synth and trap". The release was also commended for continuing Mamamoo's legacy of relaying different ideas of feminine strength through their music.

On May 29, 2020, Moonbyul released 門OON, a repackage album of Dark Side of the Moon. The single "Absence" is described as an emotional ballad with sincere lyrics written by Moonbyul conveyed heartachingly by her vocals.

Moonbyul held her first solo concert 門OON online on May 30, 2020.

In preparation for her third EP, Moonbyul pre-released the hip-hop single "G999", featuring Mirani, on December 13, 2021, and sensual R&B single "Shutdown", featuring Seori, on December 30, 2021.

On January 19, 2022, Moonbyul released her third EP, 6equence. The album depicts a chronological sequence of six scenes of a romantic relationship from meeting to parting through its six tracks, reaching the climax of obsession with house-based title track "Lunatic", and is designed to be enjoyed 'as if watching a short film'. Moonbyul stated in the run-up to 6equence'''s release that she hopes to challenge the binary view of gender through her music, reflected in her androgynous musical style and gender-neutral lyrics.

On March 5-6, 2022, Moonbyul held her second solo concerts Director's Cut: 6equence.

On April 28, 2022, she released the single album, C.I.T.T (Cheese in the Trap), containing punk rock title track of the same name, as well as acoustic R&B track "My Moon", self-composed by Moonbyul as a song for fans.

Moonbyul held her first overseas solo concerts Director's Cut: Japan Special Live in Osaka, Japan on 20 August, 2022.

Moonbyul won first place in the JTBC vocal survival program The Second World from August to November 2022, competing against fellow female idol rappers in singing. Entering the competition as a heavy favourite, she won her Round 1, Round 2, and Round 4, matches with full scores. On November 8, 2022, she won the finale of the show, scoring 4,157 points out of a total 10,000.

Moonbyul released the special single album The Present'' on her 30th birthday on December 22, 2022. The album contains the lead single "Present", a 'funk-based R&B song', as well as "A Miracle 3 Days Ago" and "Chemistry", which were previously released on her 28th and 29th birthdays.

On January 7, 2023, Moonbyul completed her first solo award show stage at the 37th Golden Disc Awards as part of her prize for winning The Second World, performing her prologue rap "On My Way" and finale winning song "Comma".

Moonbyul is set to join the judging panel of boy group survival program Peak Time, replacing Mino of Winner.

Discography

Extended plays

Reissues

Single albums

Singles

As lead artist

Collaborations

As featured artist

Soundtrack appearances

Other charted songs

Filmography

Web series

Television shows

Radio shows

Awards and nominations

Notes

References

External links

1992 births
Living people
People from Bucheon
K-pop singers
South Korean women pop singers
South Korean women rappers
South Korean female idols
South Korean jazz singers
21st-century South Korean women singers
Mamamoo members